Franklin Johnson (1849–1935), was a former Republican member of the Wisconsin State Assembly.

Johnson was born in 1849, in Greenfield, Wisconsin, where he was educated in the public schools and at home. He taught school for several terms. In 1881 he moved to Baraboo and engaged in fruit growing. In 1884 and 1885 he was clerk of the town of Baraboo, and again starting in 1892.

He was elected to the Wisconsin State Assembly in 1900, and served multiple terms.

He died in 1935 and is buried in Walnut Hill Cemetery, in Baraboo.

References

1849 births
1935 deaths
People from Greenfield, Wisconsin
People from Baraboo, Wisconsin
Republican Party members of the Wisconsin State Assembly